Zernino is a rural locality (a selo) in Klyapovskoye Rural Settlement, Beryozovsky District, Perm Krai, Russia. The population was 315 as of 2010. There are 5 streets.

Geography 
Zernino is located on the Barda River, 27 km east of  Beryozovka (the district's administrative centre) by road. Malyshi is the nearest rural locality.

References 

Rural localities in Beryozovsky District, Perm Krai